Cover Up, or variants, often refers to:
Cover-up, concealment of a scandal
Cover-up (tattoo), a tattooing method wherein a previous tattoo is tattooed over with a new tattoo.
Bathrobe or outerwear wrap, worn over bathing suits, lingerie, or nightwear
Concealer, a kind of makeup
Cover Up, or variants, may also refer to:

Film and television
Cover Up (1949 film), a mystery film by Alfred E. Green with Dennis O'Keefe, William Bendix, Barbara Britton
Cover Up (TV series), a television spy drama on CBS from 1984 to 1985
Cover Up (The Price Is Right), a segment game from The Price Is Right
"The Cover-Up" (The Office), an episode of The Office
"The Cover-Up" (Modern Family), a 2016 episode

Literature
Cover Up (novel), a 2007 children's mystery novel by John Feinstein
Cover Up, a 2005 novel by John Francome
Cover Up: What the Government Is Still Hiding About the War on Terror a 2004 non-fiction book by Peter Lance

Music 
Cover Up (Ministry album), 2008
Cover Up (UB40 album), 2001, or the title song
Cover Ups, a 2002 album by Good Riddance
The Cover Up (album), a 2004 album by I Am the World Trade Center, or the title song
The Cover Up, a 2014 EP and 2015 cover album from The Protomen
"The Cover Up", a song by Scenes from a Movie from The Pulse, 2007

See also
"Covering Up", an episode of As Time Goes By